Strategy X (ス卜ラテジーX) is an overhead, vertically scrolling shooter released in arcades by Konami in 1981. The player controls a tank through various stages, defeating enemies and picking up fuel. A port to the Atari 2600 was released in 1983.

References

External links
 
 Strategy X at Arcade History

1981 video games
Arcade video games
Atari 2600 games
Konami games
Tank simulation video games
Vertically scrolling shooters
Konami arcade games
Video games developed in Japan